How I Spent My Summer Vacation may refer to:
 How I Spent My Summer Vacation (album), an album by The Bouncing Souls
 How I Spent My Summer Vacation (1967 film), an American film
 How I Spent My Summer Vacation (1997 film), a romantic comedy film
 Get the Gringo, also known as How I Spent My Summer Vacation, a 2012 American crime thriller film